Alberto Domínguez Borrás (San Cristóbal de Las Casas, Chiapas, 5 May 1906 – Mexico City, 2 September 1975) was a Mexican marimbist and composer.  He began his career in a marimba ensemble, Los Hermanos Domínguez.

Songs

 "Frenesi" (1939)
 "Perfidia" (1939)

References

External links
 Steve Huey, "Alberto Dominguez", AllMusic.

20th-century births
1975 deaths
People from Chiapas
Mexican songwriters
Male songwriters
Mexican composers
Mexican male composers
Latin music songwriters
20th-century male musicians